XHMMO-FM is a radio station on 105.1 FM in Hermosillo, Sonora. It is owned by Radio S.A. and known as La Raza 105.1.

History
XHMMO received its concession on July 7, 1992. It was owned by María de Lourdes Palacios Andrade, but Radio S.A. began to operate the new station nearly immediately. In 1993, the group launched “FM 105.1 5 – 5 Canciones Continuas”, a format emphasizing playlists of five songs in a row. In 1994, the station flipped to grupera as "La Picuda 105.1". During this time, Radio S.A. also managed La Kaliente XHHLL-FM. In 1999, the concession was transferred to Comunicaciones ALREY.

Retaining the grupera format, XHMMO became "La Raza 105.1" in 2001. The station flipped to oldies with the launch of Sonika 105.1 in 2012.

References

Radio stations in Sonora